The 2005 Girabola was the 27th season of top-tier football in Angola. The season ran from 20 February to 23 October 2005. ASA were the defending champions.

The league comprised 14 teams, the bottom three of which were relegated to the 2006 Gira Angola.

Sagrada Esperança were crowned champions, while Académica do Lobito, Petro do Huambo and Sporting do Bié were relegated.

Arsénio Kabungula aka Love of ASA finished as the top scorer with 13 goals.

Changes from the 2004 season
Relegated: Académica do Soyo, Benfica do Lubango and Bravos do Maquis 
Promoted: Benfica de Luanda, Desportivo da Huíla, Sporting do Bié

League table

Results

Season statistics

Top scorers

Hat-tricks

References

External links
Girabola 2006 standings at girabola.com
Federação Angolana de Futebol

2005 in Angolan football
Girabola seasons
Angola
Angola